South Creake is a village and civil parish in north west Norfolk, England.

South Creake lies on the River Burn, which flows through the centre of the village. On a hill above the village can be found the Bloodgate Hill Iron Age Fort.

For the purposes of local government, the parish falls within the district of King's Lynn and West Norfolk.

Notes

External links

South Creake village signpost

Villages in Norfolk
King's Lynn and West Norfolk
Civil parishes in Norfolk